Southwest Finland, calqued as Finland Proper, is a region in the southwest of Finland. It borders the regions of Satakunta, Pirkanmaa, Tavastia Proper (Kanta-Häme), Uusimaa, and Åland. The region's capital and most populous city is Turku, which was as the capital city of Finland before Helsinki.

The area comprising the Southwest is largely the same as the historical province of Finland Proper, so named because it is the original home of the tribe known as the Finns proper.

Origin of the name Finland Proper 

The name of Finland Proper has a historical function. In historic times, in the area of the present Southern Finland lived three tribes, which were the Finns proper, the Tavastians and the Karelians. The southwestern part of the country, the province where the Finns proper lived, was simply called Finland (Finnish: Suomi). In the 17th century the name began to be used to refer to the whole land and a specified name for the lesser Finland was required. The first notes Fennigia specialiter dicta and Fennigia presse dicta were recorded in Latin in the 1650s, and the Swedish Finland för sig sielft and Egenteliga Finland later in the 18th century. The modern form Egentliga Finland was in official use at the end of the century, and the Finnish term Varsinais-Suomi became established only around the 1850s.

Geography 
Southwest Finland's nature differs from other regions. The most notable biotopes are the Archipelago Sea and groves. 80% of Finland's insect species can be found in Southwest Finland. There are around 20,000 islands near the coast.

The southernmost point of Southwest Finland and the southernmost inhabited island is Utö. Its highest point is 164 meters in Kiikala.

Historical provinces

Municipalities 

The region of Southwest Finland is made up of 27 municipalities, of which 11 have city status (marked in bold).

Åboland–Turunmaa sub-region:
 Kimitoön (Kemiönsaari)
Population: 
 Pargas (Parainen)
Population: 
Salo sub-region:
 Salo
Population: 
 Somero
Population: 
Turku sub-region:
 Kaarina (S:t Karins)
Population: 
 Lieto (Lundo)
Population: 
 Masku (Masko)
Population: 
 Mynämäki (Virmo)
Population: 
 Naantali (Nådendal)
Population: 
 Nousiainen (Nousis)
Population: 
 Paimio (Pemar)
Population: 
 Raisio (Reso)
Population: 
 Rusko
Population: 
 Sauvo (Sagu)
Population: 
 Turku (Åbo)
Population: 

Loimaa sub-region:
 Aura
Population: 
 Koski Tl (Koskis)
Population: 
 Loimaa
Population: 
 Marttila (S:t Mårtens)
Population: 
 Oripää
Population: 
 Pöytyä (Pöytis)
Population: 
Vakka-Suomi sub-region:
 Kustavi (Gustavs)
Population: 
 Laitila (Letala)
Population: 
 Pyhäranta
Population: 
 Taivassalo (Tövsala)
Population: 
 Uusikaupunki (Nystad)
Population: 
 Vehmaa (Vemo)
Population:

Demographics

As of 2020, Southwest Finland had a population of 481,403, making it the third most populated Finnish region after Uusimaa and Pirkanmaa. 86.45% speak Finnish, 5.68% Swedish and 7.86% speak other languages, the most common being Russian, Estonian, Arabic, Kurdish and Albanian.

It has the most summer cottages out of any Finnish region, with 49,000 as of 2012.

Politics 
Results of the 2019 Finnish parliamentary election in Southwest Finland:

 Finns Party 19.14%
 National Coalition Party 18.95%
 Social Democratic Party 17.78%
 Left Alliance 12.84%
 Centre Party 10.78%
 Green League 9.16%
 Swedish People's Party 5.51%
 Movement Now   1.93%
 Christian Democrats 1.85%
 Blue Reform   0.52%
 Seven Star Movement   0.16%
 Other parties 1.38%

Heraldry 
The region uses the coat of arms of the historical province of Finland Proper.

See also 
Finns proper
Southwest Finnish dialects

References

External links 

 
 South Finland EU Office

 
Western Finland Province
Finland Proper